Tal Nitzán (in Hebrew: טל ניצן) is an Israeli poet, writer, translator and editor.

Early life and education 
Nitzán was born in Jaffa in November 9th 1961 and has lived in Bogotá, Buenos Aires, and New York City. She now resides in Tel Aviv. She holds a BA in art history and Latin American studies and an MA in literature from the Hebrew University of Jerusalem.

Literary work 
Nitzán has published seven poetry books, two novels and six children's books, and has edited three poetry anthologies: two are selections of Latin-American poetry and one, 'With an Iron Pen', is a collection of Hebrew protest poetry. Her poems have been translated to more than 20 languages, and various selections of her work have been published in English, German, Spanish, French, Portuguese, Italian, Lithuanian and Macedonian.

Nitzán has translated to Hebrew works in prose, poetry, and drama, from Spanish and English. She was also editor in chief of "Latino", a series of Latin American literature in translation, of "Mekomi" ("Local" in Hebrew), a series for original Hebrew prose, both for major Israeli publishers, and of the independent literary magazine "Orot" ("lights" in Hebrew). She is a founding editor of the Israeli National Library's online literary magazine, "Ha-Mussach" ("The Garage").

Nitzán has been awarded many Israeli literary prizes (such as The Prime Minister's Prize for writers, the women's writers' prize, awards for beginning poets and for debut poetry book, the Tchernichovsky Prize for exemplary translation and more) and has participated in various local and international poetry festivals.

Selected bibliography 
Poetry books in Hebrew:
"Doméstica", 2002
"An Ordinary Evening", 2006
"Café Soleil Bleu", 2007
"The First to Forget", 2009
"Look at the same Cloud twice", 2012
"To the inner Court" (bi-lingual Hebrew-English, with artist Tsibi Geva), 2015
"Atlantis", 2019

Poetry Selections in Translation:
"Penki langai į sodą" (Lithuania, 2009), various translators.
"Architettura d'interni" (Franco Puzzo Editore, Italia, 2010), translation: Jack Arbib.
"Soirée ordinaire" (Al Manar, France, 2011), various translators.
"Dans l'esquif étroit" (with artist Guy Paul Chauder, Al Manar, France, 2011).
"Vago" (Pen Press, Argentina-USA, 2012), translation: Gerardo Lewin.
"Animale Notturno" (Il Laboratorio, Italia, 2013), translation: Jack Arbib.
"El tercer niño" (Pen Press, Argentina-USA, 2013), various translators.
"With an Iron Pen" (Anthology of Hebrew Protest Poetry, English version by Rachel Tzvia Beck, SUNY Press, USA, 2009).
"D'un burin de fer" (Anthologie de poésie israélienne engagée, traduction de Isabelle Dotan, Al Manar, France, 2013).
"O Ponto da Ternura" (Lumme Editore, Brasil, 2013), translation: Moacir Amancio.
"At the End of Sleep" (Restless books, 2014, e-book), various translators.
"To the inner Court" (with artist Tsibi Geva, Even Hoshen Books 2015), various translators.
"Zu Deiner Frage" (Verlagshaus Berlin, 2015, Illustrations: Jul Gordon), translation: Gundula Schiffer.
"Deux fois le même nuage" (Al Manar, France, 2016), with artist Albert Woda, various translators.
"La misma nube dos veces" (Buenos aires Poetry, 2019), various translators.

Novels:
"Each and every Child", Achuzat Bayit books, 2015
"The last Passenger", Am Oved, 2020

As editor:
"With an Iron Pen", an anthology of Hebrew anti-occupation poetry (1984–2004), 2005
(English version published by SUNY Press, USA, 2009; French version by Al-Manar, 2013).

Literary Translation

Nitzán is one of Israel's most prominent translators of Hispanic literature. She has translated to Hebrew circa 80 books, mostly from Spanish and from English.

For her translations she was awarded several prizes, among them the Translators Creation Prize (twice) by the Ministry of Culture and the Tchernichovsky Prize for exemplary translation.

In 2004 she received an honorary medal from the President of Chile for her translation of Pablo Neruda's poetry.

References

External links 
 Tal Nitzan's Web Page
 A radio feature on WDR, Germany
 About the anthology "With an Iron Pen" in Americans for Peace Now site
 Eli Eliahu, A Poet Must Know How to Kick, an interview with Tal Nitzán on Haaretz online, 18 June 2008
 "Buy Two Get One Free", a short story by Tal Nitzán in The Short Story Project

Israeli poets
Israeli women poets
Israeli translators
Israeli editors
Israeli women editors
Living people
1961 births
Hebrew University of Jerusalem alumni
Israeli people of Argentine-Jewish descent
Recipients of Prime Minister's Prize for Hebrew Literary Works